Manduca stuarti is a moth of the  family Sphingidae.

Distribution 
It is known from Bolivia.

Description 
It can be distinguished from all other Manduca species by the pattern and structure. There is no lateral, yellow patch found on the abdomen underside, but there are intensely coloured patches present on the more distal segments.

Biology 
Adults have been recorded from October to December.

References

Manduca
Moths described in 1896